Philipp Gilgen (born October 12, 1976) is a Swiss former swimmer, who specialized in backstroke events. He is a 2000 Olympian and a 17-time Swiss champion in both 100 and 200 m backstroke.

Gilgen competed only in two swimming events at the 2000 Summer Olympics in Sydney. He posted a FINA B-standard entry time of 56.87 from the Swiss National Championships in Zurich. On the second day of the Games, Gilgen placed thirty-fifth the 100 m backstroke. Swimming in heat three, he edged out Sweden's Mattias Ohlin to wrest a third seed by a hundredth of a second (0.01) in 57.50. Gilgen also teamed up with Remo Lütolf, Karel Novy, and Philippe Meyer in the 4×100 m medley relay. Leading off a backstroke leg in heat one, Gilgen recorded a split of 57.31, but the Swiss team settled only for sixth place and sixteenth overall with a final time of 3:42.78.

References

External links
  

1976 births
Living people
Swiss male backstroke swimmers
Olympic swimmers of Switzerland
Swimmers at the 2000 Summer Olympics
Sportspeople from Casablanca